The Curse of Oak Island is a multi-season reality television series that chronicles an eclectic team of treasure hunters and their search for legendary treasure on Oak Island, off the shore of Nova Scotia, Canada. It is an American television production that premiered in Canada on the History network on January 6, 2014. The show features what is known as the Oak Island mystery, showing efforts to search for historical artifacts and treasure.

The tenth season premiered on November 15, 2022.

Overview
The Curse of Oak Island follows brothers Marty and Rick Lagina, originally from Kingsford, Michigan, through their efforts to find the speculated treasure or historical artifacts believed to be on Oak Island. The series discusses the history of the island, recent discoveries, theories, and earlier investigations of the site. Areas of interest include the "money pit", Borehole 10-X, Smith's Cove, Site 2, "Nolan's Cross", the "Hatch", and the "Swamp".

Background
The Lagina brothers became fascinated with the island after reading the January 1965 issue of Reader's Digest magazine that features an article on the Restall family's work to investigate the so-called "money pit". Marty and Rick obtained a controlling interest in Oak Island Tours, which reportedly owns most of the island. The brothers were later approached by Prometheus Entertainment to do a reality show. Rick and Marty have engaged the assistance of father-and-son Dan and Dave Blankenship, permanent residents of the island who have likewise been searching for treasure since the 1960s. Dan Blankenship died on March 17, 2019, at age 95.

Theories
The series explores various Oak Island theories and conjectures through conversations with independent researchers. Persons featured have included Zena Halpern discussing her theory about North African gold and sharing copies of a French map of the island that she claims is dated 1347, J. Hutton Pulitzer discussing his theory of ancient mariner visitations, Petter Amundsen discussing his theory about codes hidden in Shakespearean literature and a secret project involving Sir Francis Bacon and the Rosicrucians, Daniel Ronnstam discussing his theory about the 90-foot stone being a dual cypher containing instructions on how to defeat the money pit flood tunnels with corn, authors Kathleen McGowen and Alen Butler discussing their theory involving the fabled Knights Templar treasure and an alleged relocation of historical religious artifacts to the island, and John O'Brien discussing his theory that the island contains treasures of the Aztec Empire. It has also been suggested by Zena Halpern, without evidence, that the Templars worshipped the Phoenician goddess Tanit.

Use of prior footage 
All episodes include footage from earlier episodes. Any reference to a previous discovery will feature this 'padding' technique.

Cast

Oak Island Fellowship 
Initially, the cast consisted of a core group including Rick, Marty and Alex Lagina, Dan and Dave Blankenship, Craig Tester, Jack Begley, Dan Henskee, Charles Barkhouse and Peter Fornetti. Over time, the Oak Island team has expanded. Some specialists who have been brought to the island for specific purposes, such as Terry Matheson, Laird Niven and Gary Drayton, have joined the team as full time members.
  – Brother of Marty, Rick is a retired postal worker who is the main driving force behind the project. At the age of eleven, he read an article about the Oak Island money pit in the January 1965 edition of Reader's Digest and got Marty, his younger brother, interested in the Oak Island mystery. In 2004, he and Marty purchased most of Oak Island.
  – Rick Lagina's younger brother who funds a large proportion of the project. He owns a vineyard in his home town of Traverse City, Michigan. He is a certified diver and is featured prominently in the spin-off The Curse of Civil War Gold.
In season 1, Dan is 90-years-old and does not take an active part in the search but is often sought out by team members due to his extensive knowledge. He died in 2019, prior to filming of season 7, at age 95. Dan was first attracted to the island after reading the same Reader's Digest article that was read by Rick and Marty Lagina.
  – Son of Dan Blankenship who has been helping his father on the island since the 1970s. Dave is one of only three permanent inhabitants of Oak Island. He is partially paralysed on the left side due to an industrial accident.
  – The business partner of Marty Lagina, father of Drake Tester and stepfather of Jack Begley; he is an engineer.
  – Stepson of Craig Tester, Jack tends to take on the dirtier jobs on the island, such as manually searching the spoils from various shafts, manual digging, and even walking through the swamp.
  – The son of Marty, he is a qualified diver and is featured prominently in season 2 of the spin-off The Curse of Civil War Gold.
  – One of only three Oak Island treasure hunters who have been searching the island for several decades. He initially came to the island to help Dan Blankenship in his search.
  – An Oak Island historian who also acts as a tour guide for Oak Island Tours, the company that owns most of the island. Charles is a freemason.
  – Rick and Marty's nephew
  – Rick and Marty's nephew who appeared in one episode of season 1  and became a regular in season 8. 
  – David Fornetti's friend who only appeared in one episode of season 1.
  (season 2–) – A researcher and the son of a man who worked with Robert Dunfield alongside Dan Blankenship in the 1960s.
  (season 2–4) – Son of Craig Tester and stepbrother of Jack Begley, Drake died in March 2017.
 Fred Nolan (season 3) – A land surveyor who first came to Oak Island in 1958, he was a land owner and treasure hunter on the island until his death in 2016. For much of that time he was involved in a feud with Dan Blankenship until he was convinced to join the team in season 3. Like Blankenship, his advanced age prevented him from taking a more active role in the hunt but he still provided a wealth of information to the team and his maps continued to assist the team after his death. He died before season 4 aired and did not appear during the season. It is revealed in "Drilling Down – The Truth Behind The Curse" that he never spent a night on Oak Island, despite having a house there.
  (season 4–) – A researcher who introduces the team to Zena Halpern. He is normally employed at the Centre of Geographic Sciences in Lawrencetown, Nova Scotia and is seen there during some episodes.
  (season 4–) – A heavy equipment operator who starts conducting most of the heavy digging in season 4. He has his own business called Gerhardt Property Improvement in Lunenburg, and his trucks and other machinery are often seen at the money pit and Smith's Cove areas of Oak Island.
  (season 5–) – A local geologist who joins the team to analyse cuttings and cores from the various boreholes on the island. He later takes part in the excavation of Smith's Cove.
  (season 5–) – A local archaeologist who first appears in "Always Forward", he joins the team officially in season 5 after the province of Nova Scotia's Department of Communities, Culture and Heritage insists on archaeological oversight.
  (recurring seasons 2, 4, team member season 5–) – A metal detecting expert who lives in Florida. Although he appeared in seasons 2 and 4, he did not become a permanent member of the team until sometime in season 5. He has also appeared in the spin-off The Curse of Civil War Gold.
  (season 6–) – A local surveyor, he is first brought in to compile years of data in order to find the precise location of shaft 6. Later he is seen most places where accurate coordinates are required.
  (season 7) – Son of Fred Nolan, he is first seen in season 5 and helps the team but does not become a fully fledged member until the beginning of season 7.
  (season 7) – The Oak Island Tours Inc. project manager, he appears in several episodes in season 7.

Recurring 
A number of individuals have made recurring appearances, usually when their expertise is called upon in association with the treasure hunt. They may appear many times in one season and then far more infrequently in other seasons or not at all, depending on what is required during the ongoing search.
  – A local resident and professional dive master. Like Charles Barkhouse, he is a freemason and is usually involved when there is a need to explore the waters around Oak Island or operate underwater in the island's triangle shaped swamp. However, he does appear at other times as well.
  (seasons 2–4) – A sonar expert who is periodically called in to conduct sonar scans of boreholes on the island and who has also scanned the cavern at the bottom of borehole 10–X. Although he only appears in only a limited number of episodes, the narrator explains in The Curse of Civil War Gold that he has been helping the Oak Island team "for the past six years".
 Dr. Christa Brosseau (seasons 3, 5–) – A chemist at Saint Mary's University in Halifax who is often called on to analyse artifacts found on the island.
  (seasons 3–5) – A local diver who dived borehole C–1 and has at times partnered with Tony Sampson and John Chatterton for other dives
  (seasons 4–5) – A New York-based researcher who gives the team some ancient maps and has a theory that the Knights Templar were involved in the Oak Island mystery. When she dies in season 6, she bequeaths all of her research to Rick Lagina, which results in the Oak Island Research Centre being opened.
  (seasons 4–5) – The Irving Equipment project manager at the money pit
  (seasons 4–) – CEO of ROC Equipment, a company partnered with Irving Equipment to drive caissons into the money pit area
  (seasons 5–) – A piling superintendent from Irving Equipment.
  (seasons 5–) – A member of the ROC Equipment crew, Danny is normally seen at the money pit area supervising drilling.
 Alex Gauthier (seasons 6, 7) – A former professional footballer, Alex is a representative of Eagle Canada, a geophysical exploration company that conducts seismic testing on Oak Island.
  (seasons 6–7) – A representative of Choice Drilling, a company that uses sonic drilling to take cores in the money pit area and later the triangle-shaped swamp
  (seasons 6–) – A blacksmith at Ross Farm Museum in New Ross, Nova Scotia, Carmen is often called upon to appraise iron artifacts found during the search on Oak Island.
  (seasons 7–) – A professor of Earth and environmental science at Acadia University in Wolfville, Nova Scotia, with 20-years experience in wetland geology, he visits the island many times in season 7 to conduct research on the triangle-shaped swamp at the request of the team. He has also regularly appeared in Season 8, to help the team investigate the stone pathway in the swamp.

Other significant appearances 
In addition to regular and recurring cast members, there have been several visits by people who have a significant and sometimes intimate association with Oak Island.
 Lee Lamb (seasons 1, 4–5) – Daughter of treasure hunter Robert Restall who died in an accident in 1965 with his son and Lee's brother, Robert Jr, and two other men. When she visits the island, she usually brings something of significance with her.
 Andrew Demont (season 1) – The only survivor of the accident that killed Robert Restall and three others.
 David MacDonald (season 3) – The author who wrote the January 1965 Reader's Digest story that first attracted Dan Blankenship and Marty and Rick Lagina to Oak Island. He contributes a copy of the January 1965 Reader's Digest to a time capsule that is buried next to the Oak Island bicentennial memorial.
 Joan, Jean and Joyce McGinnis (seasons 3–4) – Three sisters who are direct descendants of Daniel McGinnis, the original discoverer of the money pit. On their first visit they show the team a small cross that is allegedly part of the original Oak Island treasure. Joyce died in 2017 and, in season 4, Joan and Jean return to the island to inter some of her ashes in the foundation of what was once the home of Daniel McGinnis.
 Randall Sullivan (seasons 4, 6) – An author and investigative journalist who once wrote an article about the Oak Island search for Rolling Stone magazine and is now writing a book about the treasure hunt. He works with the team in conducting research and compiling data offering his theories based on his own extensive research. In season 6, he presents Marty and Rick with the two signed copies of his book.
 Rick Restall (season 5) – Son of treasure hunter Robert Restall and brother of Lee Lamb, returns to the island in season 5 with his sister.

Series overview

Notes

References

Further reading
 
 Sullivan, Randall (2018). "The Curse of Oak Island: The Story of the World's Longest treasure Hunt"

External links
 
 Official Facebook Page
 

2014 American television series debuts
2010s American reality television series
2020s American reality television series
History (American TV channel) original programming
English-language television shows
Television shows set in Nova Scotia
Oak Island